Khurram Khan Chowdhury (1945/6 – 17 July 2021) was a Bangladeshi politician who served four terms in parliament. Initially elected as a member of the Bangladesh Nationalist Party (BNP), he resigned from the BNP, joined the Jatiya Party, and later returned to the BNP.

Career
Choudhury was a founding member of the Jatiya Party. He was elected member of parliament for Jatiya Party and BNP candidates at different times.

Chowdhury left the BNP to contest the 1988 general election as a Jatiya Party candidate, and was elected for Mymensingh-9. At the next election, in 1991, he was elected member of parliament for Mymensingh-8.

He rejoined the BNP, and was elected to parliament from Mymensingh-9 in 2001.

Chowdhury died from complications of COVID-19 on 17 July 2021 in Dhaka at age 75 during the COVID-19 pandemic in Bangladesh.

References

1940s births
Year of birth uncertain
2021 deaths
People from Mymensingh District
Bangladesh Nationalist Party politicians
2nd Jatiya Sangsad members
4th Jatiya Sangsad members
5th Jatiya Sangsad members
8th Jatiya Sangsad members
Deaths from the COVID-19 pandemic in Bangladesh